Elena Sordelli (born 13 April 1976) is an Italian female retired sprinter, which participated at the 1997 World Championships in Athletics.

Biography
She won four medals in international competitions with the Italian national track relay team (two at senior level and two at young level). After his retirement from the competitive competitions, which took place in 2014 at the age of 38, she is the sports manager of Bracco Atletica.

Achievements

National titles
Sordelli won two national championships at individual senior level at a distance of eight years from each other.

Italian Athletics Championships
100 m: 1998, 2006 (2)

See also
Italian national track relay team

References

External links
 

1976 births
Living people
Italian female sprinters
World Athletics Championships athletes for Italy
Mediterranean Games bronze medalists for Italy
Athletes (track and field) at the 2005 Mediterranean Games
Mediterranean Games medalists in athletics
20th-century Italian women
21st-century Italian women